The Alberta Teachers' Association (ATA) is the professional association for the teachers of Alberta, Canada. It represents all teachers and teacher administrators in all schools in Alberta's public, separate and francophone school divisions. It also represents teachers in some charter and private schools. There are currently 43,500 members of the ATA. It is affiliated with other teacher organizations in Canada through the Canadian Teachers' Federation.

The Alberta Teachers' Association, as the professional organization of teachers, promotes and advances public education, safeguards standards of professional practice and serves as the advocate for its members.

History

The Alberta Teachers' Alliance was established during the First World War. Faced with constant opposition from government and employees, teachers had no basic contractual rights, no guarantee of a minimum wage and no mechanism for appealing dismissals. In addition, they were generally treated poorly in the communities they served. What teachers learned during those difficult years was that being united and having a dedicated leadership could help them shape the future. The organizing zeal of John Walker Barnett, the first full-time general secretary-treasurer of the Alberta Teachers' Alliance, became the stuff of legend. Barnett's dedication to the profession was later recognized when the Association's Edmonton headquarters were named after him.

The Teaching Profession Act was passed in 1935, giving The Alberta Teachers' Association its legal foundation. However, what united teachers and became the moral basis for the new organization was the determination to have teaching recognized as a profession. Over the next 10 years, the government approved legislation giving teachers a process for appealing dismissals, a pension plan and the right to bargain collectively. In addition, the government established the university as the home for teacher preparation.

Past presidents

Specialist councils

The ATA features a range of specialist councils created to foster professional development of teachers interested in common curriculum or specialty areas. The current councils are:

 Alberta School Library Council
 Career and Technology Studies Council
 Le Conseil francais
 Council on School Administration
 Early Childhood Education Council
 Educational Technology Council
 English as a Second Language Council
 English Language Arts Council
 Fine Arts Council
 Global Environmental and Outdoor Education Council
 Guidance Council
 Health and Physical Education Council
 Intercultural and Second Languages Council
 Mathematics Council
 Middle Years Council
 Outreach Education Council
 Religious and Moral Education Council
 Science Council
 Social Studies Council
 Council for Inclusive Education

External links

ATA Global Environmental and Outdoor Education Specialist Council Web site

Canadian Teachers' Federation
Trade unions established in 1918
1918 establishments in Alberta